Fasma (born 17 December 1996) is an Italian rapper.

Biography 
Born and raised in Rome, he founded the hip hop crew "WFK" in 2016 and released his debut EP WFK.1 on 5 July 2018.

His first studio album Moriresti per vivere con me? was released on 2 November 2018.

Fasma participated at the "Newcomers" section of the Sanremo Music Festival 2020 with the song "Per sentirmi vivo" advancing to the semifinals.

In 2021, he competed in the main section of the Sanremo Music Festival with the song "Parlami".

Discography

Studio albums 
 Moriresti per vivere con me? (2018)
 Io sono Fasma (2020)

Extended plays 
 WFK.1 (2018)

Singles 
 "Marilyn M." (2018)
 "Mi ami" (2019)
 "Per sentirmi vivo" (2019)
 "Parlami" (2021)
 "Indelebile" (2021)

References

External links

Italian rappers
Living people
21st-century Italian singers
1996 births
Musicians from Rome